William Heyberer (died 1390/1), of Gloucester, was an English politician.

He was a Member (MP) of the Parliament of England for Gloucester in 1361, 1362, 1365, 1371, 1372, 1373, October 1377, January 1380 and January 1390; and for Gloucestershire in November 1380, April 1384, November 1384, 1385 and February 1388.  He was also elected knight of the shire five times, and in that capacity attended the Merciless Parliament.

References

Year of birth missing
1391 deaths
English MPs 1361
English MPs 1362
Members of the Parliament of England (pre-1707) for Gloucester
English MPs 1365
English MPs 1371
English MPs 1372
English MPs 1373
English MPs October 1377
English MPs January 1380
English MPs January 1390